Cornufer mediodiscus is a species of frog in the family Ceratobatrachidae.
It is endemic to Papua New Guinea.

Its natural habitats are subtropical or tropical moist lowland forests, plantations, rural gardens, and heavily degraded former forest.

References

mediodiscus
Amphibians of Papua New Guinea
Taxonomy articles created by Polbot
Amphibians described in 1970